Jackson Township is one of eleven townships in Fountain County, Indiana, United States. As of the 2010 census, its population was 628 and it contained 300 housing units.

Geography
It contains the town of Wallace, located near the center of the township, and the unincorporated community of Wooley Corner to the northwest of Wallace.

Indiana State Road 32 runs along a portion of the northern border before veering east-southeast through the northeastern part of the township. Indiana State Road 234 runs from east to west through the southern part of the township.  Indiana State Road 341 begins at State Road 234 and runs north through Wallace before leaving the township.

Cemeteries
The township contains two cemeteries: Nolen and Zackmire.

References

 
 United States Census Bureau cartographic boundary files

External links
 Indiana Township Association
 United Township Association of Indiana

Townships in Fountain County, Indiana
Townships in Indiana